TJS may refer to:
 Teguh Jiwada Saragih, Medan, North Sumatera, Indonesia.
 Tajikistani somoni, the currency of Tajikistan
 Tanjung Harapan Airport, Tanjung Selor, North Kalimantan, Indonesia
 Telangana Jagarana Sena, an Indian political party
 Thomas Jefferson School (St. Louis, Missouri), an American ۶عcoeducational boarding and day school 
 Tommy John surgery, a surgical graft procedure also known as ulnar collateral ligament (UCL) reconstruction
 Tongxin Jishu Shiyan, a Chinese military satellite program
 Tujia language, a language of south-central China
 Tyrolean Jet Services, an Austrian airline
 Telangana Jana Samithi, a political party

See also 
 TJ's former live music venue in Newport, South Wales